Yezidi is a Unicode block containing characters from the Yezidi script, which was used for writing Kurdish, specifically the Kurmanji dialect (Northern Kurdish) for liturgical purposes in Iraq and Georgia.

Block

History
The following Unicode-related documents record the purpose and process of defining specific characters in the Yezidi block:

References 

Unicode blocks